Vice presidential elections  were held in Guatemala on September 12, 1980.

Background 
On September 1, 1980, Vice President Francisco Villagrán Kramer resigned due to the scale of violence and authoritarianism perpetrated by President Romeo Lucas García. Eleven days later, the Congress of Guatemala elected former President Óscar Mendoza Azurdia as Vice President.

References 

1980 elections in Central America
Elections in Guatemala
1980 in Guatemala
Vice presidential elections